Ringerike is a municipality in the traditional and electoral district Buskerud in Viken county, Norway. It is part of the traditional region of Ringerike. The administrative centre of the municipality is the town of Hønefoss.

The municipality of Ringerike was created on 1 January 1964 after the merger of the town of Hønefoss and the rural municipalities of Hole, Norderhov, Tyristrand, and Ådal. However, the area of Hole was removed from the municipality of Ringerike on 1 January 1977 to become a separate municipality once again. The historic area of Ringerike included not just the modern municipality of Ringerike but also Hole and Krødsherad, Modum, and Sigdal.

General information

Etymology
The Old Norse form of this name was Hringaríki. The first element is (probably) the genitive plural of hringir, the name of an old Germanic tribe. The last element is ríki n 'kingdom, reich'. (See also Romerike.)

Coat of arms
The coat of arms were granted on 16 June 1967. The arms show a gold ring on a red background. The colours red and gold represent royalty and are the royal colors of Norway. The ring is a canting symbol and at the same time symbolises the unity of the area, which has been a separate entity (even considered a petty kingdom) since medieval times.

Geography
The municipality of Ringerike is bordered on the north by the municipalities of Sør-Aurdal and Søndre Land; on the east by Gran, Jevnaker, Lunner, and Oslo; in the south by Bærum, Hole, and Modum; and in the west by Krødsherad and Flå.

Lakes in the region include:
Samsjøen
Øyangen
Sperillen
Ullerentjernet
Vestre Bjonevatnet

It is also home to mountain ranges, including Ådalsfjella.

Climate
Ringerike has a humid continental climate (Dfb) with relatively warm summers and cold winters, often with snow on the ground lasting for weeks. The all-time high  was recorded July 2018. The all-time low  was recorded January 2010.

Economy
Billions of Norwegian kroner has been invested (as of 2022) in infrastructure, as a result of a government order (oppdragsbrev) in 2015; the municipality had to do their part in regard to the project "Ringerike Line"; the national budget is not final yet (as of October 2022) and government money for the project has not yet been allocated.

Ringerike is famous for two agriculture products; Ringerike potato (Ringerikspotet) and Ringerike pea (Ringeriksert). Jens Aabel first started production of Ringerike potato around 1867. The Ringerike pea has obtained PDO (protected designation of origin). In June 2007, the Ringerike potato got "protected geographical indication" (PGI) under the name Ringerikspotet fra Ringerike. Six farmers are now producing and packing this special potato at Ask in Ringerike. Most of the potatoes are sold in the Oslo area.

The town was also home to the commercial operations of the Norwegian Mapping Authority which in 2004 divested these to the then Ugland IT Group, later renamed Nordeca. The offices were closed in 2010 with all operations moving to Lysaker due to increasing computerization of map-making.

Notable residents
Covers people in the wider Municipality, 

 Helge Ellingsen Waagaard (1781 in Norderhov – 1817) a farmer and non-commissioned military officer, a rep. at the Norwegian Constituent Assembly
 Michael Færden (1836 in Norderhov – 1912) a Norwegian priest and author
 Andrea Gram (1853 in Ask – 1927) a Norwegian painter of landscapes and portraits
 Rolf Bull-Hansen (1888 in Norderhov – 1970) a Norwegian educator and author
 Elling M. Solheim (1905 in Norderhov – 1971) a poet, playwright and short story writer
 Olav Brænden (1919 in Norderhov – 1989) a Norwegian pharmacist, drug expert and inventor
 Olav Aspheim (1921 in Ringerike – 1948) a member of the WWII fascist party Nasjonal Samling
 Eyvind Fjeld Halvorsen (1922 in Ringerike – 2013) a Norwegian philologist
 Arild Hiim (born 1945 in Ringerike) politician and former member of parliament
 Bjørn Kjos (born 1946 in Sokna) founder and CEO of Norwegian Air Shuttle.
 Bjørn Skogmo, (Norwegian Wiki)  (1948 in Jevnaker - 2020)  writer
 Kjell B. Hansen (1957–2020) a politician, Mayor of Ringerike 2007-2019 
 Bård frydenlund (born 1972 in Ringerike) an author and historian, CEO at Eidsvoll 1814

Sport 
 Randi Thorvaldsen (1925 in Øvre Eiker – 2011) speedskater
 Erik Hagen  (born 1975 in Veme) footballer with 360 club caps and 28 for Norway
 Rune Hagen (born 1975 in Veme) a Norwegian former footballer with 280 club caps
 Tor Øyvind Hovda (born 1989 in Ringerike) a Norwegian footballer with 250 club caps

International relations

Twin towns — Sister cities
The following cities are twinned with Ringerike:
  Aabenraa, Region of Southern Denmark, Denmark
  Lohja, Southern Finland, Finland
  Emmeloord, Flevoland, Netherlands
  Skagaströnd, Iceland
  Växjö, Kronoberg County, Sweden
  Vera, Almería, Spain in 1989

Gallery

See also
Kjølfjellet
Ringerikes Blad
Ringerike Line
Ringerike Hospital

References

External links

Municipal fact sheet from Statistics Norway
 Ringerike Kommune
 Ringerike Hospital
Ringerikes Blad
 Ringerike Sports councils 
 Ringerike (Norwegian Natural Heritage)
 The Norwegian Church in Ringerike
 Ringerikes Tourist Information
 Ringerikes Museum
 Buskerud and Ringerikes millennium
 Ringerike Historical Society

 
Municipalities of Buskerud
Municipalities of Viken (county)
Ringerike (traditional district)